In philosophy, condition of possibility is a concept made popular by the German philosopher Immanuel Kant, and is an important part of his philosophy.

A condition of possibility is a necessary framework for the possible appearance of a given list of entities. It is often used in contrast to the unilateral causality concept, or even to the notion of interaction. For example, consider a cube made by an artisan. All cubes are three-dimensional. If an object is three-dimensional, then it is an extended object. But extension is an impossibility without space. Therefore, space is a condition of possibility because it is a necessary condition for the existence of cubes to be possible. Note, however, that space did not cause the cube, but that the artisan did, and that the cube and space are distinct entities, so space is not part of the definition of cube.

It was believed that the perceptions ought to be overcome to grasp the thing-in-itself, the essential essence, also known as Plato's allegory of the cave. With Kant comes a transition in philosophy from this dichotomy to the dichotomy of the /. It is what it is, a brute fact, and what one must now examine is the conditions that are necessary for its appearance. Immanuel Kant does just this in the Transcendental Aesthetic, when he examines the necessary conditions for the synthetic a priori cognition of mathematics.

Foucault would come to adapt it in a historical sense through the concept of "episteme":

 what I am attempting to bring to light is the epistemological field, the épistémè in which knowledge, envisaged apart from all criteria having reference to its rational value or to its objective forms, grounds its positivity and thereby manifests a history which is not that of its growing perfection, but rather that of its conditions of possibility; in this account, what should appear are those configurations within the space of knowledge which have given rise to the diverse forms of empirical science. Such an enterprise is not so much a history, in the traditional meaning of that word, as an ‘archaeology’.

References

 .

Philosophy of science
Possibility
Concepts in epistemology